Sphodropsis is a genus of ground beetles in the family Carabidae. There are about 10 described species in Sphodropsis.

Species
These 10 species belong to the genus Sphodropsis:
 Sphodropsis babusarensis Casale, 1988  (Pakistan)
 Sphodropsis deuvei Casale & Ledoux, 1996  (Afghanistan)
 Sphodropsis elegans Coiffait, 1962  (Afghanistan)
 Sphodropsis elongatula Casale, 1983  (Pakistan)
 Sphodropsis ghilianii (Schaum, 1858)  (France and Italy)
 Sphodropsis heinzi Casale, 1982  (India)
 Sphodropsis nouristanensis Casale & Ledoux, 1996  (Afghanistan)
 Sphodropsis pakistana Casale, 1982  (Pakistan)
 Sphodropsis physignatha Andrewes, 1937  (India)
 Sphodropsis staveni Casale & Heinz, 2000  (Pakistan)

References

Platyninae